Chen Jin is the name of:

Chen Jin (Viceroy of Liangguang) (1446–1528), Ming dynasty general and official
Chen Jin (Viceroy of Fujian) (died 1652), general serving the Ming and Qing dynasties, Viceroy of Fujian under the Qing
Chen Jin (painter) (1907–1998), Taiwanese painter
Chen Jin (actress) (born 1964), Chinese actress
Chen Jin (computer scientist) (born 1968), Chinese computer scientist
Chen Jin (badminton) (born 1986), Chinese badminton player
Chen Jin (canoeist)
Gina Jin, also known as Jin Chen, Chinese actress

See also
Chen Jing (disambiguation)